A furanolactone is a heterocyclic chemical compound that contains both lactone and furan rings in its chemical structure.

Examples include:

 The salvinorins, including the hallucinogenic compound salvinorin A
 Columbin, a bitter diterpenoid from Calumbae Radix
 Limonoids such as limonin, nomilin, and nomilinic acid
 Tinosporide, a diterpenoid originally isolated from Tinospora cordifolia

References 

Lactones
3-Furyl compounds